Juan Sánchez Ramírez (1762–1811) was a Dominican soldier who served as the Captain general of the modern Dominican Republic between 1808 and 1811. He also commanded the troops that fought against the French rule of Santo Domingo´s colony between 1808 and 1809 in the Battle of Palo Hincado, resulting in a victory over the French, and the return of Santo Domingo to Spanish hands.

Biography

Early years 
Juan Sánchez Ramírez was born in 1762 in Cotuí, Santo Domingo. According to historian Francisco A. Rincón, he was the son of Miguel Sánchez and Francisca Ramírez. Juan Sánchez Ramírez had two brothers: Remigio and Rafael. The last of them was Magistrate of Cotuí in the Haitian period of the Dominic Republic. His father was a Spanish member of the military and a wealthy landowner. However, it was the priest Pichardo y Delmonte who took care of his education. When he was young, he led a company of lancers of Cotuí.

Ramírez held several significant positions in Cotuí, including that of magistrate.

In 1793, the Haitian Toussaint Louverture seized of the Spanish Santo Domingo and freed the slaves. In 1802, after sending Santo Domingo's colony to France with the Treaty of Basel in 1795, a troop of fifty thousand soldiers led by the French Leclerc reached the East of the island. These soldiers defeated Toussaint and took over the territory. Nevertheless, the Haitians and French occupied the lands belonging to Juan Sánchez Ramírez, and to almost all Spaniards living in the colony of Santo Domingo.

Ramírez emigrated to Puerto Rico in December 1803.

El Palo Hincado battle 
In July 1807, when Ramírez was still in Puerto Rico, he learned that the Governing Board, who replaced Fernando VII, had declared war against France. Ramirez formed a troop of two thousand men from Cuba, Puerto Rico and England  and traveled to the eastern part of Santo Domingo.
There, he encouraged its residents to take up arms against the French, to support him in the Reconquista of Santo Domingo (Reconquest of Santo Domingo). Many landowners and loggers joined his troops, while Sanchez also engaged the exploitation of timber cuts on his possessions of the eastern shores, between Higüey and Jovero (now Miches), where communications with Puerto Rico were easier. Ramírez also maintained a frequent correspondence with the General Captain of Puerto Rico Toribio Montes, who gave him official permission to face the French in Santo Domingo and promised him military and financial aid.

In early November 1808, 300 soldiers, sent by Toribio Montes, landed at Boca de Yuma and joined the forces of Sánchez Ramírez. Ramírez left El Seibo (city) in order to march on the city of Santo Domingo. On December 13, 1808, he  returned to the city with his troops. Between then and November 7, 1809, he also was leading the British and Haitian armies against French rule in the Battle of Palo Hincado, defeating Ferrand (who reached him when Ramírez was still in El Seibo) and expelling the French who were hiding in the fences of Santo Domingo. 

The survivors fled to the capital of the colony. On day 12, the square was declared under siege by Ferrand's substitute, the General Dubarquier, and 27 men reached Sánchez Ramirez, who established his camp in the Jainamosa section, on the east bank of the Rio Ozama, transferring it, shortly after, to the Gallard, or Galá hacienda.

After the French defeat, Santo Domingo was recovered by Spain, and Ramírez was appointed as Governor of the colony, while the territory was reconstituted as Captaincy General.

Government of Santo Domingo 
Sanchez convened the board of Bondillo, which established new laws and declared null and void the Treaty of Basel. So the board confirmed the permanence of Santo Domingo in Spanish hands. Santo Domingo was declared Spanish by Ramírez in July 1809.

Under his government, Santo Domingo again traded with the allied countries to Spain, and the Universidad Santo Tomás de Aquino (UASD) was reopened.

He suspended the confiscations that the French government had executed against the colony. He also allowed the British to trade in the ports of Santo Domingo.

However, Ramirez established the slave system, which had been abolished by the Haitians, and the poor poblation grew in Santo Domingo. So several attempts coup d'état to expel to Sánchez Ramírez of the Santo Domingo's government took place. The people who rebelled against their government were executed by the army, which was at the service of Ramirez, or sent to Ceuta.

Ramírez also tried to restore the Dominican economy, but Spain was engaged in the war against the then South American colonies. His mismanagement led to the period known as España Boba (Foolish Spain), in which the Ramirez government punished all those who promoted or fought for the independence of the colony.

Ramírez was ill and died on February 11, 1811, at the age of fifty, while still ruling the colony, and was buried in the National Pantheon.

Personal life 
Eventually, Ramírez became a landowner. He married Josefa del Monte y Pichardo, with whom he had two children: Juana and José. In Santo Domingo, Ramírez resided on Padre Billini´s street. After his death, his supposedly impoverished family moved to San Carlos, Santo Domingo, his widow lamenting 'he had many jobs but never a salary'.

Legacy 
 A street in Santo Domingo is named after him.

References

External links 
 Ecured: Juan Sánchez Ramírez

Colonial governors of Santo Domingo
People of the Colony of Santo Domingo
Spanish commanders of the Napoleonic Wars
1762 births
1811 deaths
People from Sánchez Ramírez Province
Dominican Republic people of Spanish descent
Dominican Republic politicians
Dominican Republic military personnel
White Dominicans